Janne Lahti (born 20 July 1982) is a Finnish former professional ice hockey forward. He most recently played with HPK of the Finnish Liiga during the 2018–19 season.

On 1 June 2007, Lahti signed a one-year contract with the Montreal Canadiens, and he played the 2007–08 season in the American Hockey League with the Hamilton Bulldogs.

References

External links
 

1982 births
Living people
Jokerit players
Ak Bars Kazan players
HPK players
Hamilton Bulldogs (AHL) players
Amur Khabarovsk players
Lukko players
Finnish ice hockey left wingers
Finnish expatriate ice hockey players in Canada
Finnish expatriate ice hockey players in Russia
People from Riihimäki
Sportspeople from Kanta-Häme